Kattusseri is a small village in Alathur Taluk, in the Palakkad district of Kerala, south India.

References

Villages in Palakkad district